The  Philadelphia Eagles season was the franchise's 83rd season in the National Football League and the third and final year of head coach Chip Kelly.

Acting as the de facto general manager, Kelly cut or traded several prominent starters, such as Nick Foles, Evan Mathis, Trent Cole, and 2013 rushing champion LeSean McCoy, while their leading receiver Jeremy Maclin left in free agency. Kelly brought in new players like Sam Bradford, Byron Maxwell, Kiko Alonso, and 2014 rushing champion DeMarco Murray, who he believed to better fit his system. After a 1-year hiatus from the NFL, the team also signed quarterback Tim Tebow on April 20, 2015 in what would be Tebow's last stint in the NFL until 2021, when he converted to tight end and play for his hometown Jacksonville Jaguars, but was cut by the team on August 17, 2021, after just one preseason game. In a mirror image of 2014, the Eagles were eliminated from playoff contention in a Week 16 Saturday Night Football loss to the Washington Redskins. On December 29, 2015, Kelly was abruptly fired by the Eagles. Offensive coordinator Pat Shurmur would take over as interim head coach for the final week of the 2015 season.

Roster changes

Free agents

Signings

Trades
 On March 3, the Eagles agreed to trade running back LeSean McCoy to the Buffalo Bills for linebacker Kiko Alonso.
 On March 10, the Eagles traded quarterback Nick Foles to the St. Louis Rams for quarterback Sam Bradford and draft compensation.
 On September 4, the Eagles traded quarterback Matt Barkley to the Arizona Cardinals for a conditional seventh-round draft pick.

Roster changes
The Eagles released veterans James Casey, Todd Herremans, Trent Cole, Evan Mathis and Cary Williams prior to the official start of the new season.

Draft

Notes
 The Eagles acquired an additional fourth-round selection (No. 113 overall) as part of a trade that sent running back Bryce Brown to the Buffalo Bills.
 The Eagles traded quarterback Nick Foles and their original fourth-round selection (No. 119 overall) to the St. Louis Rams in exchange for quarterback Sam Bradford and the Rams' fifth-round selection (No. 145 overall). The trade also includes a possible 2016 conditional selection the Eagles could receive based on Bradford's playing time in 2015. If Bradford takes less than 50 percent of the snaps, the Eagles will receive the Rams' fourth-round selection; the selection will upgrade to a third-rounder if Bradford does not play at all in 2015.

Undrafted free agents

Staff

Final roster

Schedule

Preseason

Regular season

Note: Intra-division opponents are in bold text.

Game summaries

Week 1: at Atlanta Falcons

The Eagles opened their season on the road against the Atlanta Falcons. Other than the one-handed Kiko Alonso interception in the end zone, Atlanta dominated in the first half, while former Legion of Boom cornerback Byron Maxwell had trouble covering Julio Jones. DeMarco Murray also struggled in the first half, as he had a 12-yard loss on one run. In the second half, the Eagles opened up with an interception on Matt Ryan by Walter Thurmond and scored on their next 3 possessions, and took the lead late in the 4th quarter. However, Matt Bryant kicked a field goal to give the Falcons back a 26–24 lead and the Eagles had a chance to come back. However, the Eagles were stopped on 3rd and 1, and Cody Parkey missed a 44-yard field goal attempt. Malcolm Jenkins then made a critical stop on 3rd down to force a Falcons punt. The Eagles' next drive ended as Sam Bradford threw a pass to Jordan Matthews, but the ball bounced off him and was intercepted by the Falcons, sealing a Falcons' victory.
Reigning NFL rushing champ DeMarco Murray had 8 carries for 9 yards, which included an 8-yard touchdown run. Backup Darren Sproles picked up the slack by averaging 10 yards per carry and catching 7 passes for 76 yards.

The Eagles open their season at 0–1.

Week 2: vs. Dallas Cowboys

The Eagles played poorly in a 20–10 loss to their divisional rival. The defense played a great game, but the offense was unable to convert it into points. Connor Barwin and Cedric Thornton each scored a sack, while Byron Maxwell forced a fumble that Malcolm Jenkins recovered. Rookie linebacker Jordan Hicks, who was filling in for injured stars Mychal Kendricks and Kiko Alonso, not only sacked Cowboys starter Tony Romo, but he also injured Romo and forced a fumble that Fletcher Cox recovered. However backup Brandon Weeden went 7/7 and scored a passing touchdown to seal the game. All Bradford could muster was a meaningless touchdown to Jordan Matthews in the fourth quarter. Ex-Cowboy DeMarco Murray was given the ball 13 times but only came up with 2 yards, bringing his total for the season at merely 11 rushing yards on 21 carries.

The Eagles drop to 0–2. It's the first time since 2007 that the Eagles had lost their first two regular season games.

Week 3: at New York Jets

As the visit of Pope Francis generated excitement in the city of Philadelphia, the Eagles made the first of two visits to MetLife Stadium to square off with the Jets. The Eagles improved their all-time head-to-head record against the Jets to 10–0. DeMarco Murray was out with a hamstring injury, but Ryan Mathews carried the load, rushing 25 times for 108 yards. Darren Sproles also ran for 17 yards and one touchdown, but the highlight of his game was an 89-yard punt return for a touchdown. In the first half, all areas of the Eagles dominated the Jets 24–7. Right before the first half ended, Brandon Marshall fumbled the ball on an ill-conceived lateral attempt, which was recovered the Eagles and turned into a Darren Sproles 1-yard touchdown run. In the second half, the Eagles attempted to mostly maintain the lead and run the clock out, using a majority of run plays that the Jets were able to predict. Eric Rowe, Jordan Hicks, and Walter Thurmond all intercepted Ryan Fitzpatrick in the game, who had done relatively well with turnovers until this game. The Jets would however score 10 unanswered points, but the Eagles would stop their comeback by recovering an onside kick and being able to get a first down off a last-minute Jets penalty.

The Eagles improved to 1–2 and were tied at 2nd place in the NFC East along with the Redskins and the Giants.

A day later, the Eagles announced that kicker Cody Parkey would undergo season-ending groin surgery.

Week 4: at Washington Redskins

In a heart-pounding NFC East battle, the Redskins scored a last-minute touchdown to end the Eagles' comeback hopes. The Eagles struggled in the first half as the offensive line struggled to protect Sam Bradford and the defense gave up big plays in the first half. And after DeMarco Murray's first run went for 30 yards, he only added 6 yards to it for the rest of the game. The defense would hold the Redskins from a TD on the first 2 drives. Kirk Cousins and the Redskins were able to get the ball moving in the first half. New Eagles kicker Caleb Sturgis, who replaced an injured Cody Parkey, missed a short field goal at the end of the first half and an extra point at the beginning of the second half. The Eagles were able to get the chains moving in the third quarter. Touchdowns by veterans Riley Cooper and Brent Celek gave the Eagles a tie, but Washington took the lead back. At the end of the third quarter, Brandon Graham forced a fumble on Jordan Reed, which was recovered by rookie Jordan Hicks. The Eagles would score on the corresponding drive with a Miles Austin touchdown. However, the Eagles made costly mistakes on 3rd down and had to settle for a punt with 5 minutes left in the game. The Redskins then drove down the field and Pierre Garçon scored the game-winning touchdown. The Eagles attempted to tie or win the game with only 26 seconds left, but the Redskins defense held. The offensive line failed to protect Bradford again and gave up another 2 sacks.

With the loss, the Eagles dropped to 1–3 and last place in the NFC East. However, due to the Cowboys losing and dropping to 2–2, the Eagles were only one game out of 1st place.

Week 5: vs. New Orleans Saints

Following the loss, the Eagles bounced back against the 1–3 Saints, who were also last in their division, in their first meeting since their heartbreaking last second loss in the 2013 Wild Card round. After a weak 1st quarter, the Eagles blew out the Saints and successfully got their revenge. In the 2nd quarter Sam Bradford gave second-year receiver Josh Huff his first career receiving touchdown to tie the game. Following this, veteran tight end Brent Celek gained his second receiving touchdown of the year off a 13-yarder.

Murray, Mathews, and Sproles all gained large chunks of yards, but it was Murray who finally had a respectable game, rushing for 83 yards and a touchdown after getting 20 carries, which was more than his entire season total prior to the game.

The Eagles improved to 2–3, while losses from the Cowboys and Redskins put them back in contention for the NFC East crown.

Week 6: vs. New York Giants

The Eagles came into the game seeking a win and the lead in the NFC East (the Redskins had lost to the Jets on Sunday). Although both teams committed turnovers, the Eagles came away with the win. Penalties, such as Running into the Kicker and Roughing the Passer, against the Giants gave the Eagles new life on drives that were stopped early and led to points. Although Eli Manning and the Giants' opening drive looked promising, the Giants could not get anything going after that. Bradford threw three interceptions, but DeMarco Murray had his first 100-yard game of the season, and the defense managed to shut down the giants offense.

The Eagles advanced to 3–3 and were tied with the Giants for the lead in the NFC East (the Eagles had the tiebreaker over the Giants due to their head-to-head win)

Week 7: at Carolina Panthers

Sam Bradford has been inconsistent for the previous weeks and this led to rumors about whether or not coach Kelly should bench him. Despite these rumors, the Eagles travel to Charlotte to take on Cam Newton's  Carolina Panthers, who had a dominant start to the season. The Eagles were unable to stop the Panthers hot streak as Bradford's struggles continued all game. Jason Peters left the game with a back injury.

With the loss, the Eagles drop to 3–4.

Week 9: at Dallas Cowboys

This was the Eagles' only game outside of the Eastern Time Zone during the  season.

DeMarco Murray returned to Dallas for the first time since leaving the Cowboys.

Hoping to win on his 28th birthday, Sam Bradford accomplished it by throwing the game-winning touchdown pass to Jordan Matthews for 41 yards to give the Eagles the final score in an overtime thriller.

Breakout rookie Jordan Hicks left the game with a torn pectoral muscle. The Eagles later announced that Hicks would miss the rest of the season. Up to this point, Hicks was the Eagles' leading tackler, with 1 sack, 3 fumble recoveries, 1 forced fumble, and 2 interceptions, one of which was a 67-yard pick six that was caught in this game.

With the win, the Eagles tie the season series with Dallas 1–1 and they improved to 4–4.

Week 10: vs. Miami Dolphins

The Eagles had a good first quarter and scored 16 unanswered points in the 1st quarter, but were unable to muster any points afterwards. In the third quarter, quarterback Sam Bradford left the game with a concussion along and an injured shoulder, while leading rusher Ryan Mathews left with a concussion as well. Mark Sanchez took over as quarterback for the game's remainder and led the Eagles into field goal range. Sanchez was an improvement over Bradford in some ways, mainly mobility and avoiding sacks, but he was also a less accurate passer. He was intercepted in the end zone while attempting to give the Eagles the lead, on a pass that was wrestled away from wide receiver Miles Austin in the 4th quarter.

Week 11: vs. Tampa Bay Buccaneers

Playing in the place of Bradford, Sanchez had an excellent first half, throwing for 2 touchdowns to keep the Eagles in contention, although he threw his first interception shortly before halftime. After halftime, the Eagles offense broke down. The defense, which had already broken down, allowed 5 touchdowns from rookie quarterback Jameis Winston, their once elite run defense let Doug Martin rush for 235 yards, and the Eagles were blown out at home by the Tampa Bay Buccaneers by a score of 45–17 as they fell to 4–6. The 28-point loss was the worst output at home for the Eagles since December 5, 2005 against the Seattle Seahawks, and worst to a sub-.500 opponent.

Week 12: at Detroit Lions
Thanksgiving Day game

Playing in their second straight Thanksgiving game, the Eagles struggled especially on defense, where they were unable to stop the much-hyped Lions offense, led by Matthew Stafford and Calvin Johnson, all game. The worst of it all was how unproven rookie Eric Rowe was tasked with covering wide receiver Calvin Johnson for the majority of the games, leading to Johnson catching 3 touchdowns. Philadelphia's offense was no help, either and frustrations, especially from the team's sideline boiled over. Stafford's five passing touchdowns, including three of them to Johnson was too much for the Eagles to overcome and for the second consecutive time this season, the Eagles gave up 45 points in a game.

With the loss, the Eagles drop to 4–7 on the season and 6–1 when playing on Thanksgiving. However, hope was revived for the team when the Giants, who could have moved to a commanding 3 game lead in the NFC East, fell to the Washington Redskins, meaning the Eagles were only down 1 game from the Giants and Redskins.

Week 13: at New England Patriots

In a game that was predicted to be a blowout, with a struggling Eagles defense playing a 10–1 Patriots led by Tom Brady, who led the NFL in passing yards and passing touchdowns. The Eagles held the Patriots to 0 points in the first quarter, but Brady threw a touchdown to James White on the first play of the 2nd quarter, followed by an 11-yard strike to Danny Amendola to make the game 14–0. New England tried an onside kick to surprise Philadelphia, but the special teams were ready and recovered it, giving the Eagles ideal field position. Bradford took advantage of this with a 5-yard touchdown to Zach Ertz next drive, but could not get going following the drive. With 15 seconds left, New England looked poised to end the half with a 7-point lead, but Chris Maragos blocked a punt that middle linebacker Najee Goode took back 24 yards for a touchdown. In the third quarter, Brady drove the ball to the five-yard line, but free safety Malcolm Jenkins had other plans, catching an interception and running it back for a 100-yard pick six. Next drive, New England was forced to punt, which Darren Sproles took back 83 yards for a touchdown. Next drive, Brady threw an end zone pick to cornerback Byron Maxwell, who went down in the end zone for a touchback. In a drive set up by Maxwell's INT that lasted well into the fourth quarter, Bradford threw a TD to Jordan Matthews, and the Eagles were leading 35–14. Enraged fans started to leave the stadium, but soon the lead would thicken as the Patriots scored, recovered an onside kick, and scored again, turning things to make the score 35–28 with 3 minutes left. Riley Cooper batted the next onside kick out of bounds to secure the Eagles possession. After 3rd string running back Kenjon Barner fumbled with slightly over a minute left, Tom Brady and the undermanned Patriots' offense attempted to rally to tie the game, but dropped passes by Martin and Amendola ultimately lead to the underdog Eagles stunning New England and its home crowd.

Although Bradford posted very few yards, he threw 2 touchdowns and continued to not turn the ball over. Outside linebackers Connor Barwin and Brandon Graham scored 2 sacks each. DeMarco Murray returned to his shape from weeks 1–4, rushing for 24 yards on 8 carries, which turns into a pitiful 7 carries for 5 yards when you take away his longest run of 19 yards. Darren Sproles stepped up, rushing for 66 yards, receiving for 34 yards, and returning punts for 115 yards and 1 touchdown.

With the win, the Eagles go to 5–7, ending a three-game skid and passing the Giants for second place in the NFC East. With a loss by the Washington Redskins, the Eagles' 5–7 record tied them with the Redskins for the best record in the NFC East, but their Week 4 loss kept them in second. Not only was this their first win against the Patriots in the Brady-Belichick era (preseason notwithstanding), but two years later, they would proceed to claim their first Super Bowl title in their next game against them.

Week 14: vs. Buffalo Bills

The Eagles host the Buffalo Bills with the return of LeSean McCoy, the Eagles all-time leading rusher who was traded in the offseason. McCoy's started well mentally and physically, as he kissed the Eagles logo and embraced Eagles owner Jeffrey Lurie, as well as racking up 63 yards on 12 carries. After halftime, he started to fall apart. McCoy only rushed for 8 carries and 11 yards in the 2nd half, and after the game, he was not on the field to interact with his former teammates and did not shake hands with coach Kelly, which McCoy said he wouldn't do prior to Week 14.

The game started off well for Philly, besides a first down rush by McCoy, the Buffalo offense was forced to punt after 5 plays, and on the ensuing drive, Darren Sproles rushed for 15 yards to put his team on the 1-yard line, then ran it in for a TD on the next play. The Bills answered with a Tyrod Taylor pass ro Sammy Watkins, a catch and run that went 47 yards for a TD. After several more drives, the Eagles strike again in the second quarter, with first rounder Nelson Agholor getting his first career touchdown on a 53-yard catch and run. The Bills could only muster a Dan Carpenter field goal, which was countered by a Caleb Sturgis field goal with 5 seconds left in the half. The second half started with a Caleb Sturgis field goal, but the Bills scored 10 unanswered points, then intercepted Sam Bradford on the ensuing drive. The score stayed 20–20 until the fourth quarter, where Sturgis kicked another field goal with 3 minutes left. The Bills started to gain some momentum, but a rushed pass led to an interception by backup safety Ed Reynolds clinching the game for the Eagles.

With the win, the Eagles improved to 6–7, but remained in second place in the NFC East due to a win by the Redskins.

Week 15: vs. Arizona Cardinals

For the second time this season, the Eagles wore their black uniforms as they hosted the Arizona Cardinals, who clinched a playoff spot after a Week 14 victory against Minnesota. The Cardinals didn't let up, as they mercilessly beat the Eagles 40–17. Rookie back David Johnson had a breakout game at an inconvenient time for the Eagles, as he scored 3 touchdowns and over 200 all-purpose yards.  A win from the Redskins put the Eagles 2 games down in the East, which they could easily fix by beating the Redskins the following week.

Week 16: vs. Washington Redskins

In a do-or-die situation, the Eagles died. With a chance to take control of the NFC East, they let the Washington Redskins run away with the division. After an excellent first drive where Sam Bradford played efficiently and Ryan Mathews sliced through the Redskins defense for a rushing TD, the Eagles failed to get anything going afterward. Although a missed extra point gave the Eagles the lead for most of the first quarter, after a second Cousins-Reed touchdown, they never got the lead back. After an exchange of field goals (1 by Sturgis, 2 by Hopkins) which put the Redskins up by 13, the Eagles struck back with a 4-yard DeMarco Murray touchdown to cut the deficit to 6. However, on the next Eagles drive, turnovers struck. First Darren Sproles muffed and recovered his punt for minimal gain, followed by knocking the ball of Bradford's hands on a play action fake, which was also recovered. But on 3rd down Murray fumbled a pitch which was returned for a touchdown by DeAngelo Hall, putting the Redskins up by 13, which was made even worse with a Pierre Garçon touchdown and a 2-point conversion, putting the Eagles down by 21 with 8 minutes left. The Eagles responded with a 43-yard Jordan Matthews touchdown, then the forced a Redskins punt. The Eagles got to the Redskins 26 again, but with 1:42 left on 3rd and 5, a wide open Kenjon Barner drops a potential touchdown pass, leading to a turnover on downs. Then, Cousins took 2 kneels, and the Redskins won the NFC East. The Eagles fell to 6–9 and out of the playoff picture: The loss also eliminated the Giants from the playoffs as well. Chip Kelly was fired 3 days after the game.

Week 17: at New York Giants

In their first game without Chip Kelly, who was fired days after last week's loss against Washington, the Eagles still managed to end the season on a high note with a hard-fought 35–30 victory over the Giants, in what was likely to be Tom Coughlin's final game coaching the Giants.

The Eagles went to 7–9, and completed a 2–0 season sweep over the New York Giants.

Standings

Division

Conference

References

External links
 

Philadelphia
Philadelphia Eagles seasons
2015 in sports in Pennsylvania